Hua Mak Station may refer to two stations in Bangkok, Thailand:
 Hua Mak Railway Station
 Hua Mak Station (Airport Rail Link)